Thomas Croft Neibaur (May 17, 1898 – December 23, 1942) was the first Latter-day Saint (Mormon) to receive the Medal of Honor. He was also the first soldier from Idaho to be awarded the Medal of Honor. Neibaur was an automatic rifleman who served in France during World War I. On October 16, 1918, while in battle at Côté de Chatillion, while trying to eliminate a machine gun nest, Neibaur became surrounded by 15 German soldiers. With a pistol, Neibaur killed four, and captured eleven. He received six medals for his bravery and "heroic exploits", as well as a purple heart. 

Afflicted by the Great Depression, Neibaur had little money and couldn't feed his family. Neibaur eventually sent his medals to Congress stating, "I cannot eat them." Neibaur died three years later of tuberculosis. Thomas C. Neibaur Veteran Park was dedicated in Sugar City, Idaho with a monument commemorating Neibaur. His war medals reside with the Idaho State Historical Society.

Family and early life
Thomas Neibaur had a very strong family heritage and connection in the Church of Jesus Christ of Latter-day Saints (LDS Church) beginning with his great-grandfather, Alexander Neibaur (1808–1883). Alexander was from Alsace-Lorraine, a graduate of medical and dental university training in Berlin, and was fluent in several languages. Thomas' grandfather, Joseph Neibaur, settled in Paris, Idaho in the 1880s. Thomas' parents were James C. Neibaur (1862–1938) and Elizabeth Croft Neibaur (1863–1938). The ninth of ten children, Thomas was born in Sharon, Idaho. When he was eleven years old, the family moved to Teton, near Sugar City, Idaho. Thomas and his father worked in the large sugar beet factory built in 1903, the namesake of Sugar City. In August 1907, Neibaur was baptized into the LDS Church. Though his parents and family remained faithful members of the LDS Church, Neibaur drifted from active participation. He always considered himself a believer in God, though he maintained he was not religious. Even though he was not an active member of the LDS Church, he maintained connections to it because of his family.

Military service
Neibaur enlisted into the Idaho National Guard on March 30, 1917, a week before the United States declaration of war against Germany on April 6, 1917. The Army inducted him into federal service on April 8. He then served in the Rocky Mountain northwest, guarding tunnels and railroad bridges until October 1917 when he and his 2nd Idaho Infantry Regiment was ordered to Camp Mills, Long Island. There he became an automatic rifleman in newly organized 41st Division of western states guardsman. Later moving to Camp Merritt, New Jersey the 41st Division deployed to France where it became a replacement division for the other units of the American Expeditionary Force (AEF).  Neibaur and thousands of other western guardsmen were transferred to other divisions already in France, he being assigned to M Company, 167th Infantry Regiment of the 42nd Division. This division was nicknamed the "Rainbow" division from a comment that Maj. Douglas MacArthur said while serving on the army staff that it had soldiers from many states like a "rainbow" across the land from end to end. The 167th was a regiment of the Alabama National Guard, but as all units its 4,000 men were from the regular army, national guard and draftees. The regiment has its origin from the 4th Alabama with lineage and honors from when it was a regiment in the Confederate States army.

Campaigns and battles
Private Neibaur served as an automatic rifleman using the French manufactured Chauchat 8mm automatic rifle using a "banana clip" of 20 rounds.  In February he went into the lines on the Lunéville sector, and then later in March at the Barracat sector.  He did not see any real combat except for artillery fire until March 1918, once the German "Ludendorff Offensive" commenced on March 21, 1918. He served on the Somme River where the 42nd Division was part of the French 7th Army.

In June, more American divisions entered the front lines and Neibaur fought in several campaigns, the Aisne, the Aisen-Marne, and the Champagne-Marne through August 1918.  As with any infantry regiment, brigade or division, the units rotated and relieved one another on a routine basis.  During this time, Neibaur was wounded or incapacitated temporarily by German mustard gas.

In August, Brig. Gen. Douglas MacArthur assumed command of the 84th Infantry Brigade which consisted of Neibaur's 167th Infantry Regiment and the Iowa National Guard 168th Infantry Regiment.  In early September General John Pershing, commander of the AEF, received permission to "reduce" the salient that had developed for several years at Saint-Mihiel, southeast of Verdun. Beginning on September 12, 1918, the American 1st Army under Pershing commenced an offensive, the first independent American offensive in its own sector of the Western Front. Within days, the crumbling German army was thrown back and the salient was reduced causing a "straightening" of the front line.

On September 26, the Americans launched their second offensive between the Argonne Forest on the left and Meuse River on the right. By October 14, the 42nd Division was stalled along the strongly defended Kreimehilde "stellung" (German for position or line). Unlike the Saint-Mihiel, the Germans conducted an aggressive and spirited defense. The two main terrain features holding up the Rainbow division's advance were hills: Hill 288 and the Còte de Châtillon. The 167th, specifically the Neibaur's 3rd Battalion, received the order on the 15th to attack and capture Còte de Châtillon.

On October 16, 1918, the American attacks captured Còte de Châtillon, though there remained several pockets of German units and many isolated machine gun positions. Neibaur along with two other soldiers, an observer and a loader, volunteered to flank and remove a network of machine guns just over a hundred yards from "M" Company and 3rd Battalion's hastily occupied positions. Crawling up a draw between two spurs, Neibaur's automatic rifle team encountered a wire obstacle and was then fired upon. Neibaur's two team members were killed and he received three wounds in the right thigh. Passing through the wire entanglements he positioned his automatic rifle behind a dirt berm. Some Germans observed his movement and approximately 50 or so attacked him. He opened fire with his Chauchat automatic rifle, killing or wounding most of them until his gun jammed, firing some 50 rounds or two and a half clips.

Discarding his automatic rifle, he tried to crawl or run downhill some 100 yards to friendly lines and was wounded a fourth time in the hip and fell unconscious. Awaking, he found himself captured by some fifteen or so Germans who had survived the counterattack against him. The Germans had to take cover due to the supporting fire from Neibaur's "M" Company. Neibaur then realized that the Germans had dropped on the ground near him his semi-automatic pistol, the Colt made M1911. He crawled to it and as he did so, some of the Germans charged him with bayonets, four of whom he killed immediately with his pistol and then within minutes, though wounded four times, he captured eleven Germans and led them to the American lines below.

Later life
Private Thomas Neibaur spent several months in field hospitals recovering from his wounds. His last wound by a German machine gun bullet remained in his hip the rest of his life. He was the first native-born Idaho resident to be awarded a Medal of Honor, as well as the first member of the Church of Jesus Christ of Latter-day Saints to be awarded a Medal of Honor. Neibaur also represented the first private in the U.S. Army to receive the Medal of Honor. On February 9, 1919, at the AEF headquarters at Chaumont, France, Gen. John Pershing presented the Medal of Honor to him, along with a dozen other officers and soldiers. Private Neibaur arrived home at Sugar City, Idaho on May 27, 1919, and was welcomed by a throng of some 10,000 people, celebrating a state-wide holiday proclaimed the governor who was in attendance as "Neibaur Day."

He married Sarah "Lois" Shepard in November 1919, she being six years older than he was and having a son from a previous marriage. Together they had nine children. In 1928, Neibaur had an accident at the sugar beet factory where his arm was severely mangled in a cutting machine. Workers had to disassemble the machine to free his arm. The Neibaurs had three sons who died from accidents: one (18 months old) drowned in an abandoned cesspool; another (two years) was killed by an automobile; and one (six years) died from burns and infection from a wood-burning stove.

By 1939, in the last dire years of the Depression, Neibaur was destitute. He received a small pension from his Medal of Honor, and was a clerk for Works Progress Administration (WPA).  He was unable to feed and care for his family on his low income. US Senator William Borah of Idaho attempted to pass a law in the US Congress promoting Neibaur to the rank of major in the regular army, and then placing him on the retired list. This failed. Discouraged by his misfortune, Neibaur mailed his Medal of Honor and other decorations to Congress in Washington stating that "I cannot eat them." Local newspapers covered the story. Three days later he secured a position as a night security officer at the state capitol in Boise. His wife Lois died in 1940, at the age of forty-eight from complications of rheumatic fever from her childhood. Neibaur married Lillian Golden in 1941, and a short time later he entered a veterans' hospital in Walla Walla, Washington for tuberculosis and died there on December 23, 1942, at the age of forty-four. Four young sons were sent to an orphanage in Eaton Rapids, Michigan. He and Lois are buried in Sugar City, Idaho. His awards and decorations were returned to Mrs. Lillian Neibaur who donated them to the Idaho State Historical Society. Thomas C. Neibaur Veteran Park is located in Sugar City, Idaho with a granite monument commemorating Neibaur.

Military decorations

Individual decorations

United States of America:
Medal of Honor
Purple Heart

France:
Légion d'honneur - Chevalier (Legion of Honor)
Croix de Guerre (Cross of War)

Italy:
La Croce al Merito di Guerra (War Merit Cross)

Montenegro:
Военная медаль за храбрость - Silver Medal for Military Bravery

Service Medal(s):

World War I Victory Medal with 5 Battle Clasps

Official Campaign Designations:

Information retrieved from Place the Headstones Where They Belong.

Somme Defensive   March 21, - April 6, 1918

Aisne             May 27, - June 5, 1918 (No clasp on Victory Medal)

Champagne - Marne     15-July 18, 1918

Aisne - Marne July 18, - 6  August 1918

St. Mihiel        12 - September 16, 1918

Meuse - Argonne   September 26, - November 11, 1918

Medal of Honor Citation

Information retrieved at Congressional Medal of Honor Society.

Rank and organization: Private, U.S. Army, Company M, 167th Infantry, 42d Division.
Place and date: Near Landres-et-St. Georges, France, October 16, 1918.
Entered service at: Sugar City, Idaho.
Born: May 17, 1898, Sharon, Idaho.
General Orders No.118, War Department, 1918.

Citation:

On the afternoon of 16 October 1918, when the Cote-de-Chatillion had just been gained after bitter fighting and the summit of that strong bulwark in the Kriemhilde Stellung was being organized, Pvt.  Neibaur was sent out on patrol with his automatic rifle squad to enfilade enemy machinegun nests.  As he gained the ridge he set up his automatic rifle and was directly thereafter wounded in both legs by fire from a hostile machinegun on his flank.  The advance wave of the enemy troops, counterattacking, had about gained the ridge, and although practically cut off and surrounded, the remainder of his detachment being killed or wounded, this gallant soldier kept his automatic rifle in operation to such effect that by his own efforts and by fire from the skirmish line of his company, at least 100 yards in his rear, the attack was checked.  The enemy wave being halted and Iying prone, 4 of the enemy attacked Pvt. Neibaur at close quarters.  These he killed.  He then moved alone among the enemy Iying on the ground about him, in the midst of the fire from his own lines, and by coolness and gallantry captured 11 prisoners at the point of his pistol and, although painfully wounded, brought them back to our lines.  The counterattack in full force was arrested to a large extent by the single efforts of this soldier, whose heroic exploits took place against the skyline in full view of his entire battalion.

See also

List of Medal of Honor recipients for World War I

References

Further reading
 James Hopper, Medals of Honor, 1929. (Daughter Marian has signed first edition) (Great Grand Daughter has library edition) (First edition is also housed in the Federal Govt. library, Kansas?)

United States Army Medal of Honor recipients
Chevaliers of the Légion d'honneur
Recipients of the Croix de Guerre 1914–1918 (France)
Recipients of the War Merit Cross (Italy)
United States Army soldiers
Former Latter Day Saints
Military personnel from Idaho
1898 births
1942 deaths
People from Walla Walla County, Washington
Works Progress Administration workers
United States Army personnel of World War I
World War I recipients of the Medal of Honor
People from Fremont County, Idaho
Harold B. Lee Library-related 20th century articles
20th-century deaths from tuberculosis
Tuberculosis deaths in Washington (state)